Becc or BECC may refer to:

 Becc., botanical author abbreviation for Odoardo Beccari
 Border Environment Cooperation Commission of Mexico
 British Estonian Chamber of Commerce

People named Becc 
 Bécc Bairrche mac Blathmaic (died 718), king of Ulaid in Ireland
 Bécc mac Airemóin (died 893), king of Ulaid in Ireland
 Crónán Becc, an 8th-century Abbot of Clonmacnoise

See also 
 BECCS, acronym for Bio-energy with carbon capture and storage
 Bec (disambiguation)